Pseudophilautus puranappu (Puran Appu's shrub frog) is a species of frogs in the family Rhacophoridae, endemic to Sri Lanka.

Its natural habitats are wet lowland forests of Sri Lanka. It is threatened by habitat loss. It is one of the 8 species of rhacophorids that was discovered from Adam's Peak recently.

Etymology
The frog was named after legendary hero Veera Puran Appu, who was a Sri Lankan leader led to fights against British troops in Sri Lanka.

Description
The dorsal color is well distinctive where the middle parts of the body with dark brown same as limbs, but other parts of the dorsum is light creamy brown.

References

puranappu
Amphibians described in 2013
Frogs of Sri Lanka
Endemic fauna of Sri Lanka